Stanisław Kubicki (7 November 1889 – 1942) was a Polish painter, printmaker, member of the Expressionist movement in the arts and literature.

Biography

Born as the sixth child of engineer Wital and his German mother, Maria Stark, a descendant of the architect Jakub Kubicki (1758-1833). In 1908, he began studying at the school of architecture in Bauakademie and at the Faculty of Philology at the Humboldt University of Berlin, as well as botanics and zoology. He completed neither course. He was part of the Society of Tomasz Zan and the "Grupa Narodowa" ("National Group"). He published his first works in the Berlin periodicals of "Die Aktion" and "Der Sturm". During this time, he married Margerete Schuster, he took her husband's surname and changed her name to Małgorzata. In 1911, he renewed his studies at the Academy of Arts in Berlin, however, these were halted by the start of the First World War. He was drafted into the German Army and sent to Wielkopolska.

In 1918, he moved to Berlin, where, in 1922 he founded the "Progressive" group, displaying his artwork in Düsseldorf, Aachen, Amsterdam, Chicago and Moscow. In May 1922 he attended the International Congress of Progressive Artists and signed the "Founding Proclamation of the Union of Progressive International Artists".

Until 1933, he cooperated with the news journal "a-z". During these years, he moved away from Expressionism becoming more involved with Cubism and Constructivism in his artwork. In 1933, Stanisław also founded the anarchist art group "Die Kommune".

In 1933, he moved from Berlin to Poznań. Before World War II, he tried to move to the civil war torn Spain. He abandoned painting for literature and poetry. During World War II, he helped the Home Army, acting as herald for the embassy of Manchuria in Berlin. The circumstances of his death are unknown, but were likely at the hands of the Gestapo. Stanisław Kubicki's resting place remains unknown.

Selected paintings

References

External links

1889 births
1942 deaths
19th-century Polish painters
19th-century Polish male artists
20th-century Polish painters
20th-century Polish male artists
Polish male painters
Home Army members
Resistance members killed by Nazi Germany
Member of the Tomasz Zan Society
Polish people executed by Nazi Germany
Polish anarchists
Murdered anarchists